Plasma Mobile is a Plasma variant for smartphones. It is currently available for the Pinephone, and supported devices for postmarketOS such as the OnePlus 6.

It is shipped by several Linux distributions, such as postmarketOS and Manjaro.

History

After Plasma Active sponsor Coherent Theory (under the Make·Play·Live brand) had given up their ambitions to release a tablet computer, Blue Systems emerged as a new sponsor in 2015 and shifted the focus of Plasma's handheld work towards smartphones. However, this stopped in 2021, with the project now being maintained by volunteers.

The official announcement of the new form-factor interface was on 25 July 2015 at Akademy, accompanied by a working prototype running on a Nexus 5.

Pine64 began sales of their PinePhone mobile device, with the KDE Community Edition being made available as pre-orders on 1 December 2020.

Technology

Plasma Mobile uses KWin's Wayland session. Distributions shipping Plasma Mobile can choose to support Android applications through Waydroid, which runs Android in a container on the device.

See also 
 Phosh
 Plasma Bigscreen
 Sxmo

References

External links 
 

KDE Plasma
Software that uses QML